Pacta conventa (Latin for "articles of agreement") was a contractual agreement, from 1573 to 1764 entered into between the "Polish nation" (i.e., the szlachta (nobility) of the Polish–Lithuanian Commonwealth) and a newly elected king upon his "free election" (wolna elekcja) to the throne.

The document was drawn up by the convocation sejm. The pacta conventa affirmed the king-elect's pledge to respect the laws of the Commonwealth and specified his undertakings and promises in such realms as foreign policy, taxes, public debt, the military, and so on. They varied from king to king, depending on whatever particular pledges he might have made. An example of the various concrete undertakings found in a king-elect's pacta conventa is King Władysław IV Vasa's pledge to create a Polish–Lithuanian Commonwealth Navy for the Baltic Sea.

In addition to his own unique pacta conventa, each king-elect was required to sign the Henrician Articles, a set of privileges named after the first king who signed them, Henry of Poland. Unlike the pacta conventa, the Henrician Articles were constant and unchanging. The distinction between the two documents gradually faded away over successive elections. Together, those two documents spelled out most of the critical details of the Commonwealth political system.

See also
 Royal elections in Poland
 Warsaw Confederation

Notes

External links
 From Polish online encyclopedia

Polish–Lithuanian Commonwealth
Legal history of Poland
Legal history of Lithuania
Political charters